Heyer is a surname. Notable people with the surname include:

Conrad Heyer (1749–1856), possibly the earliest-born man to have been photographed
Georgette Heyer (1902–1974), English novelist
Hans Heyer (born 1943), German racing driver
John Heyer (1916–2001), Australian documentary filmmaker
John Christian Frederick Heyer (1793 - 1873), American missionary 
John Henry Heyer (1831–1905), American politician
Hans-Joachim Heyer (1920–1942), German Luftwaffe ace
Laurie Heyer, American mathematician
Sascha Heyer (born 1972), Swiss beach volleyball player
Shane Heyer (born 1964), Canadian ice hockey linesman
Stephon Heyer (born 1984), American footballer
Volker Heyer (born 1970), German judoka